Vesela Dolyna is a village in Kamianske Raion, Dnipropetrovsk Oblast (province) of Ukraine. 

Until 18 July 2020, Vesela Dolyna was located in the Krynychky Raion. The raion was abolished in July 2020 as part of the administrative reform of Ukraine, which reduced the number of raions of Dnipropetrovsk Oblast to seven. The area of Krynychky Raion was merged into Kamianske Raion.

References

Notes

Villages in Kamianske Raion